Camarillo station is a passenger train station in Camarillo, California. Amtrak's Pacific Surfliner between  San Luis Obispo and San Diego and Metrolink's Ventura County Line between Los Angeles Union Station and Ventura–East station stop here. It is located at the foot of Ventura Boulevard at the intersection of Lewis Road, and is underneath the US Highway 101 overpass. The first Camarillo depot was at this same location until Southern Pacific ended passenger service.

History 

When the Southern Pacific Railroad built a new line from Ventura to Los Angeles, it built a depot to serve the Rancho Camarillo. It was a Southern Pacific two-story design, similar to the still existing Santa Susana Depot built on the same line. It was located where the current Ventura Freeway overpass is today. While the overpass was being built in 1955, the depot building was shifted further along the track closer to the old Ventura Boulevard rail crossing. Passenger service stops in Camarillo ended on the Coast line in the 1960s. The depot was offered to the City of Camarillo, but no location could be found to preserve it, so it was demolished in the 1970s. The Ventura Boulevard rail crossing was removed with the opening of the Ventura Freeway.

The Amtrak Coast Starlight train passed through Camarillo in the 1970s and 1980s, but did not stop for passengers. The location was an empty lot used for transloading box cars for many years. The short-lived CalTrain service also passed through Camarillo without stopping.

A temporary platform opened at the station on February 14, 1994, as part of the emergency expansion of service on the Ventura County Line in response to the 1994 Northridge earthquake. Amtrak's San Diegan trains (later renamed the Pacific Surfliner) began stopping in Camarillo on October 30, 1994.

References

External links 

Amtrak stations in Ventura County, California
Bus stations in Ventura County, California
Metrolink stations in Ventura County, California
Railway stations in the United States opened in 1994
Buildings and structures in Camarillo, California
1994 establishments in California